Messiah or Handel: Messiah features the Mormon Tabernacle Choir with the Philadelphia Orchestra, Eugene Ormandy (conductor), Richard Condie (choir director) and soloists Eileen Farrell, Martha Lipton, Davis Cunningham and William Warfield.  The classic recording of George Frideric Handel's masterpiece was recorded during the Choir's 1958 concert tour and has been remastered for CD.  This recording was selected by The National Recording Registry for the recorded sound section of the Library of Congress in 2004 as being "culturally, historically or aesthetically important."

The choir and orchestra had a long history, going back to 1936.  This recording was made in 1958 and has set a standard for classical music recordings.  It has been available for more than 50 years.

Critical reception

At the time of its release, music critics commented on the choir's "great romantic choral tone, deep with feeling that is able to communicate the inner meaning of the world's great choral music."

Paul Hume, music critic for the Washington Post, wrote that "this sound of the Mormon Tabernacle Choir has been a special beacon for those who love the world's great choral music."

In 1963 the album was RIAA certified as a Gold album.

Track listing

References

Tabernacle Choir albums
1959 Christmas albums
Christmas albums by American artists
Classical Christmas albums
Columbia Records Christmas albums